Claude Percival Thomas Lipscomb (1887- 11 April 1974) FRAeS was a British engineer and aircraft designer, who designed the RAF Bomber Command's first four-engined heavy bomber, the Short Stirling (S.29).

Early life
C.P.T. Lipscomb was born on Portsea Island.

Career

Shorts
He joined Short Brothers in 1914 in Kent, then he later designed airships at Bedford from 1916 to 1921. By the late 1930s he was assistant chief designer. He became chief designer in 1943.

Short Stirling
The Short Stirling, which he designed with Arthur Gouge, first flew, as L7600, on 14 May 1939 with John Lankester Parker, the Short Chief Test Pilot. The aircraft was designed in response to the Air Ministry Directive B.12/36. It had Bristol Hercules I radial engines. The second prototype, L7605, flew on 3 December 1939. The Stirling Mk 1 entered service in August 1940, with 756 being made. 1,047 were made of the Stirling Mk II, which entered service in 1942.

He later designed a possible transatlantic four-engine airliner, the Short 14/38.

Personal life
He lived in Kent. He married Nora Guest. He had one son. He moved to Northern Ireland and lived at 28 Shandon Park East in County Down. He died in April 1974 in Northern Ireland aged 86. His wife died on 4 May 1978, aged 90.

See also
 :Category:World War II British bombers
 Stuart Davies (engineer), co-designer of the Avro Lancaster, which first flew on 9 January 1941
 Sir Arthur Gouge, designer of the Short Sunderland, important in the Battle of the Atlantic
 George Volkert, designer of the Handley Page Halifax

References

1887 births
1974 deaths
Fellows of the Royal Aeronautical Society
People from County Down
People from Portsea, Portsmouth